Thirteen states of the United States have designated an official state dog breed. Maryland was the first state to name a dog breed as a state symbol, naming the Chesapeake Bay Retriever in 1964. Pennsylvania followed the year after, naming the Great Dane as its official breed. Dog breeds are mostly affiliated with the states that they originated in. North Carolina chose the Plott Hound as it was the only dog breed indigenous to the state.

Other official state dogs also are indigenous to their state, including the Boston Terrier (Massachusetts) and the Alaskan Malamute (Alaska). Pennsylvania selected the Great Dane not because of its origin, but because it was introduced by early settlers in the state to be used as a hunting and working dog; it was chosen over the Beagle, which was also proposed around the same time.

Two of the more recent successful campaigns to name a state dog have been started by schoolchildren. In 2007, Alaskan kindergarten student Paige Hill's idea created the campaign for the Alaskan Malamute which would convince Representative Berta Gardner to support the bill in 2009, with it becoming law in 2010. Elementary school students from Bedford, New Hampshire won their campaign for the Chinook to be accepted as a symbol of their state in 2010.

There have been a variety of campaigns in other states to select a state dog. Georgia was undecided about choosing a state dog in 1991, with an attempt to make the Golden Retriever the official dog failing after a vote in the Georgia State Senate; an opposing campaign promoted the Bulldog, the mascot of the University of Georgia. The campaign to make the Siberian Husky the Washington state dog failed in the Washington House of Representatives in 2004. In January 2019, Minnesota partnered with charity Pawsitivity Service Dogs to introduce a bill to make the Labrador Retriever the State Dog.

In 2006, New York State Assembly member Vincent Ignizio suggested that New York should adopt a dog as a state symbol, and during the campaign to name the western painted turtle as state reptile for Colorado in 2008, it was suggested by local press that the Labrador Retriever would be suitable as a symbol, even though it is not native to the state. While in Kansas as early as 2006, residents have suggested the Cairn Terrier as the state dog due to the breed's appearance as Toto in the film The Wizard of Oz. In 2012, Representative Ed Trimmer tabled a bill proposing the Cairn Terrier as a state symbol. In 2015, the "working dog", animals that have been trained for various service roles, was adopted.

Although South Dakota does not have a state dog breed, it does list the coyote—a canine species related to the dog—as its state wildlife animal. In Minnesota, legislation has been proposed on six occasions to adopt the eastern timber wolf as the state animal.

In 2013, Colorado listed rescue dogs and cats as the state pet, as did Tennessee in 2014. California also named the shelter pet as its state pet in 2015 because of all the abandoned shelter pets each year. California's legislature hopes this will cause more adoptions of pets from shelters. In 2017, Illinois designated shelter cats and dogs as the state pet as well, while in 2018, Georgia adopted "adoptable dogs" as its state dog.

State dog breeds

Proposed dog breeds
The table below shows the dog breeds which have been proposed to each state's relevant State Senate or House of Representatives, but either were not accepted as a state symbol or are still pending nominations.

Designations other than breed

See also
List of U.S. state mammals
Dogs in the United States

References

Lists of dogs
Dogs
Dogs in the United States